In music, Op. 20 stands for Opus number 20. Compositions that are assigned this number include:

 Barber – Excursions
 Bartók – Eight Improvisations on Hungarian Peasant Songs
 Beethoven – Septet
 Britten – Sinfonia da Requiem
 Chausson – Symphony in B-flat
 Chopin – Scherzo No. 1
 Dvořák – Moravian Duets
 Elgar – Serenade for Strings
 Haydn – String Quartets, Op. 20
 Hindemith – Das Nusch-Nuschi
 Knussen – Where the Wild Things Are
 Korngold – Das Wunder der Heliane
 Matthay – Piano Quartet
 Mendelssohn – Octet
 Prokofiev – Scythian Suite
 Rachmaninoff – Spring
 Ries – Cello Sonata No. 2
 Sarasate – Zigeunerweisen
 Schoenberg – Herzgewächse
 Schumann – Humoreske
 Scriabin – Piano Concerto
 Shostakovich – Symphony No. 3
 Strauss – Don Juan
 Tchaikovsky – Swan Lake
 Zemlinsky – Symphonische Gesänge